Andrew Dawson (born March 12, 1980) is an American music producer, engineer, mixer and songwriter based in Los Angeles, California. Dawson is a three-time Grammy award winner and six-time Grammy nominee, having won for his work as engineer and mixer on Kanye West's Late Registration (2005), Graduation (2007), and My Beautiful Dark Twisted Fantasy (2010) - each winning the Best Rap Album category. Dawson is also credited with additional production on My Beautiful Dark Twisted Fantasy. Although Dawson made his initial breakthrough with hip hop artists including Kanye West, Jay-Z, Common, Tyler The Creator, and P.O.S, Dawson has also moved on to produce and work on records for pop, indie and rock bands including fun., The Rolling Stones, Pet Shop Boys, Sleigh Bells, Baskery and Night Terrors of 1927.

Life and career

Personal life
Dawson began playing piano at the age of 5, studying jazz and classical piano at a private music conservatory until the age of 16. During the last few years of high school, Dawson interned at a Minneapolis recording studio and during the summers did live sound mixing for outdoor concerts. Dawson then attended Berklee College of Music in Boston, Massachusetts, where he majored in Music Production & Engineering. While living in the Boston area Dawson worked at Lexicon - a company famous for manufacturing digital reverb units including the 480L. In 2001 Dawson moved to New York City, where he worked as an assistant then later became a staff engineer at Sony Music Studios.
Dawson prefers to work on projects that have meaning, due to his passion for music, and work with artists who are equally as passionate about their records.

Dawson currently works and lives in Scottsdale, Arizona.

Work with Kanye West
In 2003, midway through the recording and producer sessions for Kanye West's The College Dropout, Dawson was called to try for the position of Kanye West's engineer. The rap artist and producer Kanye West had gone through a string of seven engineers, all of whom were fired. Dawson was able to impress the rap star and maintained his position. Since then Dawson has worked as Kanye West's primary audio and mixing engineer. In a period spanning almost 9 years, Dawson has been directly involved in all five Kanye West studio album releases, totaling in sales of over 11 million records and four #1 US albums.

SoundEQ Studios
Dawson currently has his own studio, SoundEQ Studios in Hollywood. The majority of fun.'s chart topping album Some Nights, including #1 single "We Are Young" was recorded at SoundEQ Studios. Dawson has hosted co-writing sessions with artists and writers including Andy Grammer, Hudson Taylor, Baby E, Zack Waters, K.Flay, Michelle Branch, Kimbra, and Jimmy Harry.

Discography

 Indicates Grammy win.

References

1980 births
Living people
Record producers from Minnesota
American audio engineers
Place of birth missing (living people)
Berklee College of Music alumni
Musicians from Minneapolis
Businesspeople from Minneapolis
Hopkins High School alumni